The 45th Iowa Infantry Regiment was an infantry regiment that served in the Union Army during the American Civil War. It was among scores of regiments that were raised in the summer of 1864 as Hundred Days Men, an effort to augment existing manpower for an all-out push to end the war within 100 days.

Service
The 45th Iowa Infantry was organized at Keokuk, Iowa, and mustered in for one hundred days of Federal service on May 25, 1864, as part of a plan to raise short-term regiments for service as rear area garrison duty to release veteran troops for Sherman's Atlanta Campaign.  The 45th Iowa garrisoned strategic points on the Memphis & Charleston Railroad.

The regiment was mustered out at Keokuk on September 15, 1864.

Total strength and casualties
A total of  972 men served in the 45th Iowa at one time or another during its existence.
It suffered 3 enlisted men who were killed in action or who died of their wounds and 19 enlisted men who died of disease, for a total of 22 fatalities.

Commanders
 Colonel Alvah H. Bereman

See also
List of Iowa Civil War Units
Iowa in the American Civil War

Notes

References
The Civil War Archive

Units and formations of the Union Army from Iowa
Military units and formations established in 1864
1864 establishments in Iowa
Military units and formations disestablished in 1864
1864 disestablishments in Iowa
1864 disestablishments in the United States